Thomas Bonacum (January 29, 1847 – February 4, 1911) was an Irish-born American prelate of the Catholic Church. He was the first bishop of the Diocese of Lincoln in Nebraska, serving from 1887 until his death in 1911.

Biography

Early life 
Thomas Bonacum was born January 29, 1847, in Penane,near Thurles, County Tipperary in Ireland, the youngest of four children of Edmund and Mary (née McGrath) Bonacum. While he was still an infant, the family immigrated to the United States in 1848, settling in St. Louis, Missouri.

Bonacum received his early education in St. Louis before attending Saint Francis de Sales Seminary, near Milwaukee, from 1863 to 1867. Returning to Missouri, he completed his studies for the priesthood at St. Vincent's Seminary in Cape Girardeau.

Priesthood 
Bonacum was ordained a priest for the Archdiocese of St. Louis on June 18, 1870, at St. Mary of Victories Church in St. Louis. He was ordained by Bishop Joseph Melcher, the Bishop of Green Bay. After serving for a few months as assistant pastor of St. Joseph's Parish in Edina, Missouri, Bonacum served as pastor of St. Stephen's Parish in Indian Creek, Missouri, from 1871 to 1874. He then served as pastor of St. Peter's Parish in Kirkwood, Missouri (1874-1877).

Bonacum then furthered his studies in Europe, attending the University of Würzburg in Bavaria for two years. While there, he studied theology under Franz Hettinger and canon law and church history under Joseph Hergenröther. After returning to the United States, Bonacum served as pastor of St. Patrick's Parish in Rolla, Missouri, until 1880, when he was transferred to Immaculate Conception Parish in St. Louis. He remained there for a year before serving as pastor of Holy Name Parish (1882-1887).

While pastor at Holy Name, Bonacum attended the third Plenary Council of Baltimore from November to December 1884, as a theological consultant to Archbishop Kenrick. He greatly impressed the bishops at the Council, who nominated Bonacum to be the first bishop of the proposed Diocese of Belleville. However, the establishment of the diocese was postponed for three years and Bonacum remained at St. Louis during that time.

Bishop of Lincoln 
On July 7, 1887, a cablegram from Rome announced that Pope Leo XIII appointed Bonacum to be the first bishop of the newly-erected Diocese of Lincoln. The official papal document confirming his appointment was dated August 9, 1887, arriving the following September. Bonacum received his episcopal consecration on November 30, 1887, from Archbishop Kenrick, with Bishop Louis Fink and Bishop James O'Connor serving as co-consecrators, at St. John's Church in St. Louis.Bonacum was installed on December 21, 1887, at St. Teresa's Pro-Cathedral. 

In 1888, the first full year of his episcopate, the diocese contained a Catholic population of 23,000 with 32 priests, 29 parishes, and three parochial schools. By the time of Bonacum's death in 1911, there was a Catholic population of 37,000 with 84 priests, 135 churches and 65 with resident pastors, and 28 parochial schools.

Egan dispute 
In 1888, Bonacum sued Patrick Egan, a prominent Lincoln citizen and later U.S. Ambassador to Chile, for failing to pay a pledge he had made for the improvement of St. Teresa's Pro-Cathedral. It was rumored that Egan, a staunch Republican, was unhappy that Bonacum attended a Democratic reception. The case went to the Nebraska Supreme Court, which ruled in Bonacum's favor and ordered Egan to pay the pledge.

Corbett dispute 
In 1891, Bonacum brought Rev. Martin Corbett of Palmyra, Nebraska, with whom he had many quarrels, before a diocesan court that consisted of five other priests. The charges against Corbett were dismissed, but Bonacum tried to remove Corbett from his position in 1894. Corbett refused and sued Bonacum for libel after Bonacum wrote a letter announcing Corbett's suspension to his congregation. Bonacum gained a victory when the libel suit was dismissed, but it was still the first time a Catholic bishop had been brought to criminal court in the United States.

Murphy dispute 
A group of priests submitted a list of complaints against Bonacum to Francesco Satolli, the U.S. Apostolic Delegate, in 1893. In retaliation, Bonacum tried in 1895 to expel one of those priests, William Murphy, who had also presided over the diocesan trial that originally ruled in Corbett's favor. Murphy appealed to church authorities and in 1896 an ecclesiastical court of the metropolitan Archdiocese of Dubuque reversed Bonacum's decision and ordered him to pay a fine as well as Murphy's legal fees.

In 1900, Bonacum tried to remove Murphy from his position as pastor of St. Vincent's Church in Seward, Nebraska, which also included charge of Immaculate Conception Church in Ulysses, Nebraska. When Murphy refused to step down, Bonacum excommunicated him and brought action in court to have him removed from the church property. This litigation would last for more than ten years, moving through both secular and ecclesiastical courts and even coming to the personal attention of Pope Pius X.On June 18, 1909, when Bonacum came to Ulysses to remove Murphy from Immaculate Conception Church. However, Murphy had strong support from the congregation and a mob of more than 200 people forced Bonacum to leave. Even when the bishop tried to take a taxi out of town, the mob followed him and forced him to get out of the car and walk several miles to the next town.

That battle only ended in 1911, when both Bonacum and Murphy died; the bishop from natural causes and the priest from a car accident. As a result of their feud, Pius X issued a new rule prohibiting priests or bishops from suing a fellow clergyman in secular court.

Death and legacy 
Thomas Bonacum died from complications of pneumonia and Bright's disease on February 4, 1911, aged 64. Upon his death, Lincoln mayor Don Love issued the following proclamation: "By this sad event we have lost not only a great prelate but a distinguished and public-spirited citizen as well...It would be a fitting tribute to display emblems of mourning along our public streets and to close our offices and places of business during the hour of his funeral."

References

1847 births
1911 deaths
People from Thurles
Irish emigrants to the United States (before 1923)
Roman Catholic bishops of Lincoln
19th-century Roman Catholic bishops in the United States
20th-century Roman Catholic bishops in the United States